Norbert Bonvecchio (born 14 August 1985) is an Italian athlete specialising in the javelin throw. Earlier in his career, he competed in the high jump.

His personal best in the event is 80.37 metres, set in Braunschweig in 2014.

International competitions

Seasonal bests by year

2008 - 70.23
2009 - 70.74
2011 - 75.52
2012 - 79.22
2013 - 77.78
2014 - 80.37
2015 - 79.45
2016 - 79.21
2017 – 79.80
2018 – 70.93
2019 – 73.22
2020 – 74.64

References

External links

1985 births
Living people
Italian male javelin throwers
Competitors at the 2013 Summer Universiade
Athletes (track and field) at the 2013 Mediterranean Games
Mediterranean Games competitors for Italy
University of L'Aquila alumni
Italian Athletics Championships winners